The Ambassador Extraordinary and Plenipotentiary of the Russian Federation to the Republic of Seychelles is the official representative of the President and the Government of the Russian Federation to the President and the Government of Seychelles.

The ambassador and his staff work at large in the Embassy of Russia in Victoria. The post of Russian Ambassador to Seychelles is currently held by Artyom Kozhin, incumbent since 15 January 2020.

History of diplomatic relations

Diplomatic relations at the mission level between the Soviet Union and Seychelles were first established on 30 June 1976. The first ambassador, was appointed on 4 April 1977, and presented his credentials on 27 June 1977. With the dissolution of the Soviet Union in 1991, the Soviet ambassador, continued as representative of the Russian Federation until 1995.

List of representatives (1977 – present)

Representatives of the Soviet Union to Seychelles (1977 – 1991)

Representatives of the Russian Federation to Seychelles (1991 – present)

References

 
Seychelles
Russia